The 1969 Women's Open Squash Championships was held at the Lansdowne Club and Royal Aero Club in London from 11–16 January 1969.Heather McKay (née Blundell) won her eighth consecutive title defeating Fran Marshall in the final.

Seeds

Draw and results

First round

Second round

Third round

Quarter-finals

Semi-finals

Final

References

Women's British Open Squash Championships
British Open Squash Championships
Women's British Open Squash Championships
Squash competitions in London
Women's British Open Championships
British Open Championships
Women's British Open Squash Championship